Felicissimus Raeymaeckers (born 1915 in Westmeerbeek) was a Belgian clergyman and prelate for the Roman Catholic Archdiocese of Lahore. He was appointed bishop in 1966. He resigned in 1975, and died in 1978.

References 

1915 births
1978 deaths
Belgian Roman Catholic bishops